Leicester City Women Football Club is an English professional women's football club based in Leicester. Founded in 2004 as an independent club, Leicester City Women were acquired in 2020 by King Power, the parent company of men's affiliate Leicester City FC. They currently compete in the FA Women's Super League, the first level of the English football pyramid.

Leicester City Women won promotion back into the FA Women's Premier League Northern Division in 2016 winning a record 22 games out of 22. After finishing third and second in the Northern Division in 2017 and 2018 respectively, Leicester City Women applied to take part in the inaugural FA Women's Championship season (2018–19). The Foxes had their bid accepted as announced by the Football Association in May 2018.

Leicester City Women also run a Reserves team and the Leicester City Women Development Centre. The development centre expanded at the beginning of the 2017/18 season and caters for under-9s, 10s, 11s, 12s, 13s 14s, 15s, 16s and 18s.

History

Early years and success (2004–2013)
Founded in 2004, Leicester City Women achieved four successive promotions in their first four seasons, winning the Leicestershire County League, Unison East Midlands Southern League, Unison East Midlands Premier and Midland's Combination League to gain promotion into the FA Women's Premier League Northern Division (second tier) in 2008. Cup success also came early with Leicester winning their first of 7 consecutive Leicestershire & Rutland County FA Cup's in 2006, as well as winning their respective League Cup's in 2005, 2006 and 2007. Leicester also reached the Fifth Round of the 2007–08 Women's FA Cup before being beaten by top tier side Everton.

The Foxes finished 5th in their first season in the Northern Division (Second Tier), then going on to finish third in the 2009–10 season before the newly created FA Women's Super League came into effect as the new top tier meant the FA Women's Premier League Northern Division became a third tier league. Leicester had applied to join the FA Women's Super League in December 2009, but in March 2010 they were announced as a losing bidder for the inaugural season.

Leicester consolidated themselves in the third tier with two more back-to-back 3rd place finishes in the 2010–11 and 2011–12 seasons, as well as maintaining their Leicestershire County Cup run of success, winning their 6th and 7th consecutive trophies in 2011 and 2012 respectively.

Up and down years (2013–2018)
Leicester City Women suffered their first on-pitch relegation in May 2013, finishing bottom of the FA Women's Premier League Northern Division having picked up just four points from 16 games. The club hired Stuart Wilson as Manager as they looked for an immediate return to the third tier. Unfortunately, the club lost out on promotion to Copsewood FC (Copsewood became Nuneaton Town Ladies before folding) Leicester City WFC did, however, regain the County Cup having lost in the final the previous season.

When Stuart Wilson left in the Summer of 2014, Reserves manager Jonathan Morgan stepped up to take charge of First Team affairs in a 'Management Trio' along with James and Ryan who also stepped up from the Reserves. Halfway through the season, with the club sitting second, but eight points behind the leaders Loughborough Foxes, Chairman, and father of Jonathan, Rohan Morgan felt a change in Management was needed and Jonathan Morgan was given the sole responsibility whilst James and Ryan departed the club. Michael Makoni stepped up from the Reserves to become Jonathan's assistant. Leicester would finish the 2014/15 season in second place after a 3–3 draw with Loughborough Foxes and a 2–1 defeat to third-placed Leafield Athletic.

After a number of squad changes for the 2015–16 season, Leicester City WFC started brightly picking up three wins in August, scoring 20 goals and conceding just one. The Foxes continued their fine form through until Christmas, losing just once in the opening four months, a league cup match against Bradford City from the Division above. Despite being knocked out of the County Cup and FA Cup in successive weeks early in 2016, Leicester City WFC maintained their incredible 100% record in the league, winning the Midland Division and confirming promotion back to the Northern Division with a 10–0 win over Rotherham United Ladies. Leicester City WFC came from behind to win late on in a number of games that season, but their impressive 22 wins out of 22 games was confirmed on the final day of the season when Helen Busby netted in the 91st minute away to Wolves having been pegged back at 1–1 just a few minutes before.

Leicester enjoyed a largely successful first season back in the Northern Division, picking up some big wins throughout the season and ending their 3rd tier return in 3rd position, again their joint-highest finish in the Division. Leicester reached the County Cup Final before losing 2–1 to Loughborough Foxes, they also reached the League Plate Semi-Final and the FA Cup 4th Round before narrow defeats in both stopped their progress.

Still under the stewardship of Jonathan Morgan and Michael Makoni, Leicester made a number of big signings in the Summer of 2017, picking up key players with experience in the Northern Division. The club finished second in the league, 10 points behind Blackburn Rovers, with Rosie Axten the top goalscorer for both the Club and the Northern Division. They also made it to the Fifth Round of the FA Cup, reached the FA Women's Premier League Cup final and regained the County Cup.

FA Women's Championship (Tier 2) to FA Women's Super League (Tier 1) (2018–present)

In May 2018, Leicester City Women were one of five new teams awarded a licence to join the FA Women's Championship following an extensive application process, securing a return to the second tier for the 2018–19 season after eight years away. Leicester opened their first campaign in the newly named FA Women's Championship with a 2–0 away victory against fellow newcomers Crystal Palace. The Foxes eventually going on to end their return to the second tier in 7th place.

Boosted by a host of new signing's, Leicester hoped to push on in the next campaign and after a stuttering start eventually found themselves with a 6th place finish following a four-game unbeaten run in early 2020 before the COVID-19 pandemic shortened the 2019–20 season. Cup success did manage to return however with Leicester reaching the Quarter Finals of the Women's FA Cup for the first time thanks to a 2-1 extra time victory over WSL opposition Reading set up a date with Manchester City for later in 2020.

On 22 August 2020, the club was bought by men's club Leicester City FC's parent company King Power, having previously been run as an independent club with an informal cooperation to the Foxes. The club became fully professional in the process. On 6 September 2020, the club played and won its first match as a "professional" outfit, starting their league campaign with a 3-0 victory over Blackburn Rovers thanks to goals from Charlie Devlin and new signing Natasha Flint. Despite being unable to best WSL side Manchester City in the 2019–20 Women's FA Cup Quarter Final on 27 September 2020, the Foxes kept up their run of setting personal bests in cup competitions, reaching the Semi Final of the 2020–21 FA Women's League Cup before falling to WSL side Bristol City. On 4 April 2021, the club won the Women's Championship after a 2–0 victory over London City Lionesses, sealing promotion to the FA Women's Super League in the process. On 12 May 2021, Leicester defeated Manchester United 3–2 in the Fifth Round of the 2020–21 Women's FA Cup, before losing a second consecutive Quarter Final to Manchester City later in the year.

On 4 September 2021, Leicester City played their first FA Women's Super League and first tier fixture, losing 2–1 to Midlands rivals Aston Villa, having initially taken the lead through Flint. In September, former Leicester City men's and England striker Emile Heskey was appointed as an ambassador to the club. In October 2021 Heskey was then given the job role of Head of women's football development at the club  replacing the outgoing, Russ Fraser. In November 2021 it was confirmed that then manager Jonathan Morgan had been relieved of his duties at the club and was replaced by Lydia Bedford. On 19 December 2021, Leicester picked up their first WSL victory, 2–0 at home to Birmingham City thanks to goals from Sophie Howard and Sam Tierney. As a result of the following upturn in form during the second half of the season, Leicester finished their debut top-flight campaign in 11th place, retaining their status.

Home stadium

Leicester City Women play at King Power Stadium; Pirelli Stadium is their alternative venue when scheduling clashes with the men's team prevent playing at King Power Stadium.

Between 2017 and 2021, Leicester City Women played at Farley Way Stadium, home of Quorn FC. Up until 2017, they played at Riverside Pavilion in Leicester. Before moving to Riverside, Leicester City Women moved between grounds in different seasons, including Harborough Town's Bowden Park and Oadby Town's Freeway Park.

Training ground
In January 2021 the men's teams were relocated to a new purpose built training ground. The former Premier League team's facility at Belvoir Drive was then handed over to the women's teams for full-time use.

Honours

League
 FA Women's Championship
Winners (1): 2020–21
 FA Women's Northern Division
Runners-Up (1): 2017–18
 FA Women's Midlands Division One
Winners (1): 2015–16
Runners-up (1): 2014–15
 Midlands Combination League
 Winners (1): 2007–08
 Runners-up (1): 2013–14
 Unison East Midlands Premier
 Winners (1): 2006–07
 Unison East Midlands Southern League
 Winners (1): 2005–06
 Leicestershire County League
 Winners (1): 2004–05

Cup
 FA Women's Premier League Cup
 Runners-up (1): 2017–18
 Midland Combination League
 Runners-up (1): 2007–08
 Unison East Midlands Premier League Cup
 Winners (1): 2006–07
 Unison East Midlands Southern League Cup
 Winners (1): 2005–06
 Leicestershire County League Cup
 Winners (1): 2004–05
 Leicestershire & Rutland County FA Cup
 Winners (9): 2017–18, 2013–14, 2011–12, 2010–11, 2009–10, 2008–09, 2007–08, 2006–07, 2005–06
 Runners-up (3): 2016–17, 2012–13, 2004–05

Players

Current squad

Out on loan

Former players

Club staff

Player statistics

Player of the Year

Supporters Player of the Year
Leicester City's Supporters Player of the Year award is voted for by the club's supporters at the end of every season.

Players Player of the Year
Leicester City's Players Player of the Year award is voted for by the club's players at the end of every season.

Players with over 50 professional appearances for Leicester

Includes competitive appearances only from 22 August 2020 when the club turned professional. Current players in bold.

  Sam Tierney 71
  Ashleigh Plumptre 66
  Sophie Howard 63
  Natasha Flint 63
  Esmee de Graaf 53

Players with over 10 professional goals for Leicester

Includes competitive goals only from 22 August 2020 when the club turned professional. Current players in bold.

  Natasha Flint 25

International honours
. Only caps won and goals scored at Leicester included, current players in bold.

  Sophie Howard (16 Caps, 1 Goal)
  Ashleigh Plumptre (11 Caps)
  Carrie Jones (7 Caps, 2 Goals)
  Hannah Cain (4 Caps)
  CJ Bott (3 Caps, 1 Goal)
  Paige Bailey-Gayle (3 Caps)
  Natalie Johnson (2 Caps)
  Courtney Nevin (1 Caps)
  Josie Green (1 Cap)

References

External links

Official website

2004 establishments in England
Association football clubs established in 2004
Women's football clubs in England
Leicester City F.C.
Football clubs in Leicestershire
Sport in Leicester
FA Women's National League teams
Leicester City W.F.C.